The articles listed below on specific bodies of water—seas, lakes, rivers, etc.—have significant content on the subject of fly fishing for the fish that swim in them or are notable fly fishing destinations in Europe.

Austria

Rivers
 Traun River

Belgium

Rivers
 Ourthe

Bosnia and Herzegovina

Rivers
 Vrelo Bosne
 Neretva
 Rakitnica
 Buna River
 Bunica
 Bregava
 Trebižat River
 Drina
 Sutjeska
 Tara
 Piva
 Pliva
 Janj River
 Sana River
 Ribnik River
 Sanica River
 Una
 Unac River
 Klokot River
 Krušnica River
Mountain Lakes
 Šatorsko Lake
 Boračko Lake

Great Britain

Rivers
 River Itchen
 River Test
 River Usk
 River Wylye
 River Avon-Wiltshire/Hampshire
 River Kennet
 River Tamar
 River Don-Aberdeenshire
Small Still Waters
 Amwell Magna Fishery
 Lechlade & Bushyleaze Trout Fishery
 Chalk Springs
 Lenches Lakes
 Dever Springs
 Tavistock Trout Fishery
 Tree Meadow Trout Fishery
Reservoirs
 Blagdon Lake
 Carsington Water
 Draycote Water
 Eyebrook Reservoir
 Grafham Water
 Stithians
 Thornton Reservoir

Hungary

 Balaton
 Lake Tisza
 Gaja patak
 Szinva
 Garadna
 Jósva     
 Tolcsva
 Bán patak
 Zala river

Ireland

 River Erne
    River Suir
    River Nore
    River Barrow
    River Slaney
    River Boro
    River Bann
    Owenavorragh River
    Derry River
    Urrin River
    Sow
    River Fergus
    Camcor River
    Lough Derg
    Lough Ree
    Lough Ennell
    Lough Owel
    Lough Sheelin
    Lough Derravaragh
    Lough O'Flynn
    Pallas Lake
    Munster Backwater
    River Lee
    River Bandon
    River Arigideen
    Sullane River
    River Blackwater
    Waterville Lakes and System
    Caragh Lakes and System
    Laune, Flesk and Killarney Lakes

Spain

 River Órbigo
 River Porma
 River Esla
 River Omaña
 River Torio
 River Curueño
 River Carrión
 River Pisuerga
 River Veral
 River Aragón
 River Aragón Subordan
 River Ara
 River Cinca
 River Escá
 River Gállego
 River Pilueña
 River Tajo
 River Gallo
 River Tormes
 River Najerilla
 River Saja
 River Besaya
 River Tavascan

Sweden
Miekak

Norway

Rivers
 Tana
 Gaula
 Orkla
 Namsen
 Altaelva
 Renaelva
 Hemsila
 Nidelva
 Trysilelva
 Glåma
 Nea
 Tya

Slovenia
 river Soca
 Sava Bohinjka
 Sava Dolinka
 river Savinja
 river Dreta
 river Krka
 Vipava

See also
List of fly fishing waters in North America

External links
 Venues in Europe
 Venues in wales - uk
 Fishing-Trout-Fisheries-England.html Venes in england - uk

Notes

List of fly fishing waters in Europe
Recreational fishing-related lists